is a former Japanese football player.

Playing career
Sawada was born in Aichi Prefecture on June 5, 1982. He joined J1 League club Nagoya Grampus Eight from youth team in 2001. However he could not play at all in the match behind Japan national team goalkeeper Seigo Narazaki. In July 2001, he moved to Japan Football League (JFL) club Denso on loan and played 7 matches. In 2002, he returned to Nagoya. However he could not play at all in the match. In July 2002, he moved to J2 League club Ventforet Kofu. However he could not play at all in the match behind Tatsuya Tsuruta. In 2003, he moved to J2 club Mito HollyHock. On August 17, he debuted in J.League as substitute goalkeeper from the 45th minute against Kawasaki Frontale. However he could only play this match. In 2004, he moved to JFL club Denso (later FC Kariya) again. He played many matches as regular goalkeeper until 2005. However he could hardly play in the match in 2006 and retired end of 2006 season.

Club statistics

References

External links

1982 births
Living people
Association football people from Aichi Prefecture
Japanese footballers
J1 League players
J2 League players
Japan Football League players
Nagoya Grampus players
FC Kariya players
Ventforet Kofu players
Mito HollyHock players
Association football goalkeepers